Chandina is an upazila of Comilla District in the Division of Chittagong, Bangladesh.

Geography
It has 46,856 households and a total area of 201.92 km2. Chandina township is a class B municipality, which is located at the extreme north of the upazila by the Dhaka Chittagong Highway. Cahndiara village area is within the municipality and value of property here, like the rest of the municipality, have increased significantly.

Demographics

According to the 2011 Census of Bangladesh, Chandina upazila had a population of 350,273 living in 69,736 households. Its growth rate over the decade 2001-2011 was 14.45%. Chandina has a sex ratio of 1112 females per 1000 males and a literacy rate of 51.01%. 48,471 (13.84%) live in urban areas.

Administration
Chandina Upazila is divided into Chandina Municipality and 13 union parishads: Barera, Bataghashi, Borcarai, Borcoit, Dollai Nowabpur, Etberpur, Gollai, Joag, Kerankhal, Madhaiya, Maijkhara, Mohichial, and Shuhilpur. The union parishads are subdivided into 121 mauzas and 223 villages.

Chandina Municipality is subdivided into 9 wards and 19 mahallas.

See also
Upazilas of Bangladesh
Districts of Bangladesh
Divisions of Bangladesh

References

 
Upazilas of Comilla District